Agent X (Nijo Minamiyori, alias Alex Hayden) is a fictional mercenary appearing in American comic books published by Marvel Comics. Created by Gail Simone and Alvin Lee, the character first appeared in Agent X #1 (Sept 2002), by Gail Simone and UDON.

Publication history
Agent X was born out of Marvel Comics' long-running Deadpool series with experiments including the "miniseries within a series," (Deadpool: Agent of Weapon X and Deadpool: Funeral for a Freak, where the main series' numbering was demoted to secondary status below the "miniseries" numbering), having failed to stymie the leak. The decision was then taken to run a "final arc" to close the series, then restart it from #1 with an X in the title in an attempt to more closely identify it with their popular X-Men franchise (as part of the same effort, Cable was changed to Soldier X and X-Force was changed to X-Statix). Rumors circulated among fans that the title relaunches at this time (including Deadpool to Agent X) were due in part to a royalty dispute with Rob Liefeld; the rumors were dispelled by Liefeld himself.  Online humorist Gail Simone was chosen to write both Deadpool'''s final arc and the new series, with the UDON studio, who had recently revamped the Taskmaster in a well-received miniseries, to supply the art.

Agent X replaced Deadpool with a similar protagonist, while including ambiguous hints as to the nature of his relationship with the original character. Simone publicly clashed with Marvel's editorial staff as the relaunched title struggled to find a foothold. Simone left the book after issue 7. The series continued the cynical, slapstick action which had characterized its parent series. Indeed, a central feature of Agent X was the question of the title character's identity, sometimes implied to be Deadpool himself. Deadpool refers to Agent X as his "Earth-2 Counterpart," a comedic reference to DC Comics' designation of different Earths for different iterations of identical and similar characters.

Towards the end, two of these fill-ins were published to small fanfare: those by noted author Evan Dorkin and the acclaimed art team of Juan Bobillo and Marcelo Sosa. Soon after, Agent X was canceled with issue #12. However, shortly after this announcement, Marvel decided to launch a Cable & Deadpool book as a change in direction, which ended up being a much more successful consolidation of the two characters into one title. This allowed Simone and UDON to complete their initial vision as part of a three-issue arc tying up the loose ends and restoring Deadpool for use in the new book, which was published after a month's hiatus as Agent X #13-15.

Agent X also appeared in Cable & Deadpool #11-12. He would make another appearance in #38-39, where he was captured on a mission against HYDRA, who were able to give him arthritis using new technology, then morbid obesity so he wouldn't notice the arthritis. He was subsequently rescued by Deadpool, who was hired by Sandi and Outlaw. After being rescued, Agent X decided to allow Deadpool to run Agency X until he was cured of his disabilities.

In the 'Dear Deadpool' section of #37, the writers jokingly hinted that Agent X may receive a new ongoing series sometime in the future.

Fictional character biography
Nijo was an assassin, mercenary, and agent employed by the telepathic German assassin called the Black Swan. He blamed Deadpool for his brother's death as he was among the targets of Deadpool's apparently successful assassination of the Japanese crime lords named the Four Winds. After Black Swan downloaded a mental virus into Deadpool's brain, the mercenary came for both Swan and Nijo at the Swan's castle in Germany. However, Black Swan revealed he had in fact killed the Four Winds, including Nijo's brother, and stabbed him out of boredom with his ranting and disobedience. His vendetta with Deadpool was that the hits had erroneously been credited to the wrong man. A bomb Deadpool had brought went off, and all three were presumed killed.

However, Alex Hayden soon emerged in New York with one goal in mind—to be the best mercenary alive. He was found by Sandi Brandenberg, Deadpool's former secretary, who assumed he was Deadpool by his powers and demeanor. He subconsciously took the name as a combination of composers he liked: Alexander Grieg and Josef Haydn, which Sandi worked out through his fondness for classical music. Sandi's friend and distant romantic interest Taskmaster was sought to help him get his bearings and train him, as was Outlaw, for her shooting skills. Taskmaster noticed Alex was ambidextrous and that he was somehow interfering with his reflex ability while training with him. Taskmaster then knew he couldn't be Deadpool, despite his healing factor and recognition of him and Sandi, and Outlaw corroborated this as Alex proved to be a better gun talent than Deadpool. Sandi and Alex formed a mercenary group, Agency X. The headquarters is located in an amusement park Alex acquired as payment for his first mission.

Alex ran into Outlaw while assigned to try to take out the Punisher and steal his Colt .45 handguns. They failed and were locked up in a phone booth minus their weapons and clothes by Castle. The Punisher then killed the people who had sent them. Afterwards, Outlaw and Alex became romantically involved. However, Taskmaster, who was jealous of Sandi's attachment to Alex, had set up Alex on that mission and he was kicked out of the agency. He then contacted Higashi, the new leader of part of the Four Winds organization and informed them that Alex was Deadpool, who still held the credit for killing the previous four crime heads. The organization, primarily directed by Higashi's enforcer, Saguri, therefore held Alex, Sandi and Taskmaster responsible but with Outlaw's help, the three made a last stand at the amusement park against an army of mercenaries and supervillains, while Sandi was given to Higashi for safekeeping, as his infatuation with her would keep her protected. Agency X were triumphant and Alex blackmailed the crime lords into submission, while killing Saguri after surreptitiously being hired by Higashi to do so. Higashi was also convinced by Sandi that Alex was not Wade Wilson and was now more fully in control of his group, so he agreed to prevent any further reprisals on the foursome. Alex was enthused at what appeared to be a fresh start for the Agency but was hurt when Outlaw announced her desire to return home to the South to care for her dying father instead, while Taskmaster declined a full-time position.

Alex performed his assignments solo from then on, but he found his personal life further muddied when he and Sandi spent a night together. He became disillusioned with his work and decided to shut down the agency, but found himself unable to tell Sandi, who by then had set up a job for him and Taskmaster to act as bodyguards to Higashi as a final act of ceasefire. While on their way to a meeting between the Four Winds families,  Alex's group was attacked by a pair of over-cheerful assassins, but after a frantic battle, they  arrived safely to find one of the Four Winds families had ordered the hit on Higashi. Now that Higashi was indebted to them, Alex, Taskmaster and Sandi returned to Sandi's apartment to find Black Swan and a tabula rasa Deadpool waiting. It turned out that all three had partially merged during the explosion when Black Swan used his powers in an act of desperation to save himself. Black Swan psionically acquired Deadpool's healing factor but accidentally made contact with Nijo and personal traits had been mixed around. Swan had also given Nijo's corpse Deadpool's regenerative powers (restoring him to a form of life 5 minutes after his death), as well as part of his personality, while Nijo also gained Swan's firearms talents, ambition, some of his refined tastes, preferences and biases, and also the bodily scarring and outrage he'd received from Deadpool throwing him face first into a white hot fireplace griddle at his home.

Black Swan proposed a three-way mind meld to restore each man to their correct personal states, but doublecrossed them. Outlaw returned in time to help fight the Black Swan, who had now absorbed both Alex and Deadpool's powers to augment himself. Even though Alex called Higashi's favor in and surrounded Swan with hitmen, this proved to be fruitless, so Alex devised a new plan. After Taskmaster and Outlaw distracted him, Deadpool pinned Swan to Taskmaster's explosives-laden van and Alex ignited it. Alex then reversed Black Swan's absorption, but also gave him the memories of being caught in the bomb explosion in Germany. The group then repeatedly shot the Black Swan to make sure he was dead. The body was taxidermied and carried around by each couple (Taskmaster and Sandi, Alex and Inez) as a prop while they went on vacation.

When they later found themselves on opposing sides over the fate of Cable, Alex had another confrontation with Deadpool, which he lost initially, giving Deadpool the opportunity to spell out "Hi, Weasel" with his entrails as a "surprise" for his best friend. Unable to do much damage to each other due to their healing factors, they relented after Wade agreed to hand Alex his pancreas back.

After a botched attempt to steal a device from Hydra, Sandi and Outlaw convinced Deadpool to rescue Alex. Alex had been affected by the device he was supposed to steal, giving him arthritis and "the American gene" (which resulted in making him incredibly fat). This made escape physically impossible - though he would not want to miss out on the many treats and monkey chow that were being given to him as a lab specimen. Deadpool managed to free Alex with the help of Bob, Agent of HYDRA. He then asked Deadpool to run Agency X whilst he got himself back in shape, reasoning with himself that his only other alternatives were to shoot himself or eat Sandi and his business.

In Deadpool: Suicide Kings #2, Outlaw tells Deadpool that Alex has lost 14 lbs thanks to Jenny Craig, though Deadpool implies that he is still overweight. By the events of Domino #1 Alex has regained his former physique, attributing his weight loss to diet shakes.

Powers and abilities
Agent X possesses a superhuman healing factor, allowing him to regenerate damaged or destroyed bodily tissue with far greater speed and efficiency than an ordinary human. Agent X is able to heal injuries such as slashes, puncture wounds, bullet wounds, and severe burns within moments. His healing factor is developed to the point that he can regrow and reattach missing limbs and organs. His healing factor has allowed him to survive even brain punctures on numerous occasions. With this superior healing factor, he has shown a unique tolerance towards pain. His body is highly resistant to most drugs and toxins. For example, it is extremely difficult, though not impossible, for him to become intoxicated. He can, however, be affected by certain drugs, such as tranquilizers, if he is exposed to a massive enough dosage. Agent X's healing factor also extends to his immune system, rendering him immune to the effects of all known diseases and infections. Agent X's healing factor provides him with an extended lifespan by slowing the effects of the aging process to an unknown degree. The healing factor causes his brain cells to be in a constant state of flux and regeneration, rendering him immune to psychics such as Professor X and Emma Frost.

Because of his healing factor, Agent X can push his muscles to levels beyond the natural limits of an ordinary human being without sustaining injury, giving him superhuman strength. He is capable of lifting in more than 800 lbs and is shown to lift up to 3 tons. The exact limit of his strength is unknown. His musculature generates considerably less fatigue toxins than the muscles of an ordinary human being, granting him superhuman levels of stamina in all physical activities. He can physically exert himself at peak capacity for at least 18 hours before fatigue begins to impair him. His agility, balance, and bodily coordination are enhanced to levels that are beyond the natural physical limits of even the finest human athlete, on par with Deadpool. His reflexes are similarly enhanced, superior to those of even the finest human athlete.

Additionally, Agent X was trained by Taskmaster in weapons and combat and is also an expert marksman. The most common weapons Agent X uses are pistols, knives, and throwing stars.

 Reception 

 Volumes 
Scott Thomas of SlashFilm included the comic book series Agent X in their "10 Deadpool Comic Storylines We'd Love To See In Deadpool 3" list. Shaurya Thapa of Screen Rant ranked the comic book series Agent X 5th in their "10 Comics To Read If You Love The Boys" list, writing, "With enough goofy, cynical comedy, the series is a fun read that is bound to impress fans of Deadpool. [...] the comic is iconic as it preceded Cable & Deadpool, and has gained a cult status over time." 

 Accolades 

 In 2021, Screen Rant ranked Agent X and Deadpool 7th in their "10 Strangest Friendships In Deadpool Comics" list.
 In 2022, Screen Rant ranked Agent X 5th in their "10 Best Mercenaries In Marvel Comics" list.

Other versions

House of M
An Asian male wearing yellow goggles and a belt forming an X around his chest is shown under the Sapiens Resistance group in House of M'' issue 4.

References

External links
 

Comics characters introduced in 2002
2002 comics debuts
Characters created by Gail Simone
Fictional blade and dart throwers
Fictional characters with slowed ageing
Fictional mercenaries in comics
Marvel Comics characters with accelerated healing
Marvel Comics characters with superhuman strength
Marvel Comics martial artists
Marvel Comics male superheroes
Deadpool titles